is a municipality in Buskerud in Viken county, Norway.  It is part of the traditional region of Hallingdal.  The administrative center of the municipality is the village of Gol which is also the population center.  Gol was established as a municipality on 1 January 1838 (see formannskapsdistrikt). The area of Hemsedal was separated from Gol in 1897 to become a separate municipality. The municipality of Gol is bordered to the north by the municipality of Nord-Aurdal (in Oppland county), to the east by  Sør-Aurdal (in Oppland county), to the south by Nes, and to the west by Ål and Hemsedal.

General information

Name
The Old Norse form of the name was Gǫrð. This is probably an old river name (for the lower part of Hemsil river). The name of the river maybe derived from the word garðr m 'fence; border' - and the meaning is then 'the border river'.

Coat-of-arms

The coat-of-arms is from modern times.  They were granted on 13 September 1985.  The arms are gold with three black keys in the center.  The keys are derived from the key for Gol stave church.

Transport
The Bergen Line from Bergen to Oslo runs through Gol Station which opened in 1907.  Gol is connected to Norwegian National Road 7, 50 and 52  as well as  Norwegian county road 51. There are daily bus connections to Gjøvik and Lillehammer.

Gol Church
Gol Church (Gol kirke)  was constructed during 1882 based upon a design by architect Henrik Nissen. The church is characterized by neo-Gothic style with gables and small towers with crosses.  It was built of wood and has 500 seats.

The mediaeval Gol stave church (built ca. 1216) was due for demolition after the construction of the larger and new church. Gol stave church was saved from destruction by the Society for the Preservation of Ancient Norwegian Monuments (Fortidsminneforeningen), which bought the materials with the intention of re-erecting the church elsewhere. Financial problems were solved when King Oscar II decided to pay for its relocation and restoration as the central building of his private open-air museum near Oslo.

The restoration was overseen by architect Waldemar Hansteen. It was completed in 1885. In 1907, the royal museum was merged with the Norsk Folkemuseum, which now manages the stave church, still nominally belonging to the reigning monarch.

Attractions
Gordarike Familiepark  is a theme park located in downtown Gol. The theme and environment are built to reflect  the Viking Era and Middle Ages.  A modern replica of Gol stave church has been built as a tourist attraction at the park.  The replica was built in the 1980s and consecrated in 1994.
Gol Bygdetun is an open-air museum  located in the village of Gol. It was built around the old Skaga farm. It is dedicated to the cultural history of Gol, and contains farm buildings of nearly all types. Barns, lofts and wooden stables  are all  featured together with a millhouse, a school house  and a log cabin.  The oldest building dates back to 17th century. Gol Bygdetun is a subsidiary of Hallingdal Museum which operating in association with Buskerudmuseet.

Notable residents
 Bjørn Frøysåk (1634 in Gol – 1709) a Norwegian farmer and merchant
 Johan Willoch Erichsen (1842–1916 in Gol) a Norwegian Bishop of Bjørgvin 
 Lilly Heber (1879 in Gol – 1944)  Norwegian literary critic and historian 
 Hans Johan Jensen (1882–?) a Norwegian politician, farmer and carpenter
 Sigrun Eng (born 1951 in Sør-Fron) a Norwegian politician, member of Gol municipal council 1983 to 1991
 Pål Golberg (born 1990 in Gol) is a Norwegian cross-country skier

Sister cities
The following cities are twinned with Gol:
  - Årjäng, Värmland County, Sweden
  - Fanø, Region Syddanmark, Denmark
  - Virrat, Länsi-Suomi, Finland
  - Bracebridge, Ontario

Gallery

References

External links

Municipal fact sheet from Statistics Norway

 
Hallingdal
Municipalities of Buskerud
Municipalities of Viken (county)
Villages in Buskerud